George Washington Bragg (January 24, 1926 – May 31, 2007) was an American conductor and founder of the Texas Boys Choir.

Biography

George Bragg was born on January 24, 1926, in Meridian, Mississippi, to George W. Bragg, Sr. and Elizabeth Hairston Bragg.  In 1934 he moved to Birmingham, Alabama, where he joined the famous Apollo Boys' Choir. On February 7, 1946, Mr. Bragg, a freshman at North Texas State College, founded the Denton Civic Boys Choir. The choir moved to Fort Worth, Texas, in 1957 and was renamed the Texas Boys Choir. In the same year, the choir appeared on the "Pat Boone Show."

In 1959, George Bragg, Stephen Seleny, and James Walker founded the Texas Boys Choir School which three years later became Trinity Valley School. Under Mr. Bragg's direction, the choir grew in prominence and became a world-class musical organization.  In 1961, the choir made its Town Hall debut in New York City.  On the morning of Nov. 22, 1963, the choir sang at Hotel Texas in Fort Worth for President and Mrs. John F. Kennedy, several hours before his assassination.  In the 1960s, the choir appeared on the "Perry Como Show" and "The Ed Sullivan Show."  After conducting the choir on a recording of his "Persephone," the famous composer Igor Stravinsky called the choir "the greatest boy choir in the world."  Mr. Bragg received his first Grammy Award in 1967 from the National Academy of Recording Arts and Sciences for Best Choral Performance on "Charles Ives:  Music for Chorus."  The following year he received his second Grammy Award for "The Glory of Gabrieli," which was recorded in St. Mark's Basilica in Venice, Italy. During Mr. Bragg's tenure, the choir gave over 3,000 performances which included 13 domestic and five European concert tours.  They also performed on radio and television as well as with opera companies and symphony orchestras.  Under his direction, the choir recorded 26 albums. Mr. Bragg left the choir in 1975 to share his expertise with other boy choirs throughout the United States.

In 1994, Bragg was diagnosed with Parkinson's disease. He suffered a debilitating stroke in 1996, and died a decade later, on May 31, 2007.

Memberships and affiliations 
 Phi Mu Alpha Sinfonia
 Alpha Alpha, 1969 (National Honorary Chapter)
 Gamma Theta, 1946 (University of North Texas College of Music Chapter)
National Academy of Recording Arts and Sciences (Lifetime Member)

References 

1926 births
2007 deaths
American male conductors (music)
Grammy Award winners
University of North Texas College of Music alumni
Phi Mu Alpha Sinfonia
20th-century American conductors (music)
20th-century American male musicians